Na Chaluai is a district (amphoe) in the southern part of Ubon Ratchathani province, northeastern Thailand.

History
The Ministry of Interior created the "minor district" (king amphoe) Na Chaluai on 1 February 1972, when the three tambons (sub-districts) Na Chaluai, Phon Sawan, and Non Sombun were split off from Det Udom district. The sub-district was later upgraded to a full district on 12 April 1977.

More than 80 percent of Na Chaluai's people moved there from other districts. This area was a battle field of Communist Party of Thailand and the Royal Thai Army during the time of Vietnam War.

Geography
Neighboring districts are (from the west clockwise) Nam Yuen, Det Udom, Buntharik and the Laotian province of Champasak.

Phu Chong-Na Yoi National Park is in the district. The important water resource is the Dom Yai river.

Administration
The district is divided into six sub-districts (tambons), which are further subdivided into 68 villages (mubans). Na Chaluai is a township (thesaban tambon) which covers parts of tambon Na Chaluai. There are a further six tambon administrative organizations.

References

External links
amphoe.com
 Phu Chong Na Yoi National Park

Na Chaluai